Critoniopsis is a genus of flowering plant in the aster family.

 Species

References

 
Asteraceae genera
Vernonieae
Taxonomy articles created by Polbot